Santa Corona is a Gothic-style, Roman Catholic church located in Vicenza, region of Veneto, Italy. The church contains the Valmarana chapel (circa 1576), whose design is attributed to the Renaissance architect Andrea Palladio. Palladio himself was initially buried in this church.

History
Construction on the church was begun in 1261 by the Blessed (Beato) Bishop Bartolomeo di Breganze to house a thorn from the supposed relic of the crown (corona) of thorns forced on Jesus during his passion. The thorn had been given to this bishop as a gift from Louis IX of France. The church belonged to the Dominican order until suppression during the Napoleonic era.

The church has an altarpiece depicting, the Baptism of Christ (1500-1502) by Giovanni Bellini. The Thiene chapel has frescos by Michelino da Besozzo, and an altarpiece depicting an Enthroned Madonna and child venerated by Saints Peter and Pius V  by Gianbattista Pittoni.

Other works in the church include an Adoration of the Magi’’  by Veronese, a Madonna of the Stars'‘ by Marcello Fogolino, a St Mary Magdalen with Saints Jerome, Paola and Monica, (1414-1415) by Bartolomeo Montagna, a canvas depicting St Anthony and friars distributing alms to poor (1518) by Leandro Bassano, and two canvases with depictions of St Sebastian and St Martin by Battista da Vicenza.

In a small chapel off the sacristy are a number of statues of Dominican saints, including that of Vincent Ferrer.

Valmarana Chapel 
After the death of one of his patrons, Antonio Valmarana, Andrea Palladio designed the funereal chapel for Isabella Nogarola Valmarana. Santa Corona had already been the church were other members of the family had been interred. The chapel was constructed between 1576 and 1580. Earlier, Palladio had designed the Palazzo Valmarana in town for the family. It highly resembles his chapels found at the Il Redentore in Venice.

Palladio died in 1580 and was initially buried in Santa Corona, before being re-interred in a new tomb in a cemetery chapel in 1844.

References

External links
Valmarana Chapel entry
Year of Palladio entry for Valmarana Chapel

Corona
Valmarana Chapel
Corona
Vicenza
Vicenza